Valin is a surname. Notable people with the surname include:

Jonathan Valin (born 1947), American writer
Martial Valin (1898–1980), French aviator
Pierre-Vincent Valin (1827–1897), Canadian businessman and politician

See also 

 Vatin (surname)

Surnames
Surnames of French origin
French-language surnames